Eldøyane is a partially man-made former island located just outside the town of Leirvik in the municipality of Stord in Vestland county, Norway.  The island was connected to the larger island of Stord by land reclamation, and over the years, the former island has been flattened and expanded by land reclamation.  This now makes it a peninsula jutting out into the Hardangerfjorden.  Eldøyane is the location of the company, Aker Stord, making it a large industrial site, one of the largest sites in the town of Leirvik.

References

Former islands of Norway
Islands of Vestland
Peninsulas of Vestland
Stord